The Bondareva–Shapley theorem, in game theory, describes a necessary and sufficient condition for the non-emptiness of the core of a cooperative game in characteristic function form. Specifically, the game's core is non-empty if and only if the game is balanced. The Bondareva–Shapley theorem implies that market games and convex games have non-empty cores. The theorem was formulated independently by Olga Bondareva and Lloyd Shapley in the 1960s.

Theorem 
Let the pair  be a cooperative game in characteristic function form, where  is the set of players and where the value function  is defined on 's power set (the set of all subsets of ).

the following condition holds:

References 

Game theory
Economics theorems
Cooperative games
Lloyd Shapley